Baveleh may refer to:
 Baveleh-ye Seyyedan
 Baveleh-ye Sofla